Katherine Bell may refer to:

Katherine Bell (General Hospital), a fictional character in the TV series General Hospital
Katherine Bell (volleyball) (born 1993), American volleyball player
Katherine Bell, author of a story in The Best American Short Stories 2006

See also
Katy Bell (disambiguation)
Kate Bell (disambiguation)
Catherine Bell (disambiguation)